The Presidential Decree of July 5, 1959 (legally the Decree of the President of the Republic of Indonesia Number 150 of 1959 on the Return to the Constitution of 1945) was issued by President Sukarno in the face of the inability of the Constitutional Assembly of Indonesia to achieve the two-thirds majority to reimpose the 1945 Constitution. It was army chief of staff Abdul Haris Nasution who concluded that this would be the only way to bring about the reintroduction of a constitution that paved the way for the military to play a greater role in the running of the state, ushering in the period known as the "guided democracy" (1959–1966).

The Decree
The decree, which was read by Sukarno at the Merdeka Palace reads as follows:

Aftermath
After Sukarno enacted the decree, he dissolved the Constitutional Assembly by abrogating the 1950 Provisional Constitution. This decree caused the cabinet to be directly led by the President. However, the decree had received support from the military because it gave them a greater role in the state security.

References

 Riklefs (1982), A History of Modern Indonesia, Macmillan Southeast Asian reprint, 
 Sekretariat Negara Republik Indonesia (1975) 30 Tahun Indonesia Merdeka: Jilid 2 (1950–1964) (30 Years of Indonesian Independence: Volume 2 (1950–1964))
 Sukarno (1959), President Sukarno Decrees Indonesia to Re-adopt 1945 Constitution, Embassy of Indonesia (Australia), 
Widjaya, A. W. (1989). Dekrit Presiden 5 Juli 1959 dan UUD negara Indonesia dalam lintasan sejarah dua dasawarsa, 1945-1965. Indonesia: Fajar Agung. 

Guided Democracy in Indonesia
Sukarno
Legal history of Indonesia
Sukarno's 1959 Decree
1959 documents